A Pasteboard Crown is a 1922 American silent drama film directed by Travers Vale and starring Evelyn Greeley, Robert Elliott and Gladys Valerie.

Cast
 Evelyn Greeley as Sybil Lawton
 Robert Elliott as Stewart Thrall
 Gladys Valerie as Edna Thrall
 Eleanor Woodruff as Cora Manice
 Jane Jennings as Mrs. Lawton
 Dora Mills Adams as Claire Morrell
 Albert Roccardi as William Buckley

References

Bibliography
 Munden, Kenneth White. The American Film Institute Catalog of Motion Pictures Produced in the United States, Part 1. University of California Press, 1997.

External links
 

1922 films
1922 drama films
1920s English-language films
American silent feature films
Silent American drama films
American black-and-white films
Films directed by Travers Vale
1920s American films